The Ustilaginaceae are a family of smut fungi in the order Ustilaginomycetes. Collectively, the family contains 17 genera and 607 species.

Biotechnological relevance
Ustilaginaceae naturally produce a wide range of value-added chemicals (e.g. secondary metabolites, TCA cycle intermediates) with growing biotechnological interest. Reported metabolites are polyols, organic acids, extracellular glycolipids, iron-chelating siderophores and tryptophan derivatives. Polyols, such as erythritol (ery) and mannitol, for example, have large markets as sweeteners for diabetics and as facilitating agents for the transportation of pharmaceuticals in medicine. Itaconic, L-malic, succinic, l-itatartaric, and l-2-hydroxyparaconic acid are organic acids produced by many Ustilaginomycetes. Applications for itaconic acid are for example the production of resins, plastics, adhesives, elastomers, coatings, and nowadays itaconate is discussed as a platform chemical in the production of biofuels. Malic acid is used in many food products, primarily as an acidulant. Succinic acid is utilized as a precursor to pharmaceutical ingredients, such as additives, solvents, and polymers, but also as a food additive and dietary supplement. Another category of metabolites produced by smut fungi contains extracellular glycolipids, such as mannosylerythritol lipids and ustilagic acid. These lipids have biosurfactant properties and can be used in pharmaceutical, cosmetic, and food applications and are known for their strong fungicidal activity on many species.

Genera

Ahmadiago
Aizoago
Anomalomyces
Anthracocystis
Bambusiomyces
Centrolepidosporium
Eriocaulago
Eriomoeszia
Eriosporium
Franzpetrakia
Macalpinomyces
Melanopsichium
Moesziomyces
Parvulago
Pericladium
Pseudozyma
Sporisorium
Stollia
Tranzscheliella
Tubisorus
Ustilago

References

External links

Ustilaginomycotina
Basidiomycota families
Taxa named by Edmond Tulasne
Taxa described in 1847